Kimsquit Peak, 2268 m, is a mountain in the Kitimat Ranges of the Coast Mountains of British Columbia, Canada, located immediately north of the former Nuxalk village of Kimsquit, which is at the mouth of the Dean River.  Immediately to its west across the head of Dean Channel is Comet Mountain.

See also
Kimsquit Ridge

References

Central Coast of British Columbia
Kitimat Ranges
Two-thousanders of British Columbia
Range 3 Coast Land District